NGC 427 is a spiral galaxy of type (R)SB(r)a: located in the constellation Sculptor. It was discovered on September 25, 1834, by John Herschel.

It was described by Dreyer as "3 very small (faint) stars with nebulosity (?)."

References

External links
 

0427
18350925
Sculptor (constellation)
Spiral galaxies
004333